Heneicosane is the organic compound with the formula CH3(CH2)19CH3.  It is the straight chain, saturated C21 hydrocarbon.  It is a white wax.

Natural occurrence
Heneicosane is used as a pheromone by the queen or king termites in the species Reticulitermes flavipes. It also attracts mosquitoes in the genus Aedes and can be used in mosquito baits. This works in nature as the hydrocarbon is produced in the skin of the larva. A 1:100000 fraction in water is the most attractive, but if the concentration is 1:1000 then mosquitoes are repelled instead. Heneicosane is one of the major components of the safflower flower essential oil (Carthamus tinctorius). All parts of the plant Periploca laevigata contain heneicosane. Rosa damascena flower essential oil contains 5% heneicosane. Sambucus nigra contains 2.3%.

References

Alkanes